Ralph Brownrigg or Brownrig (1592–1659) was bishop of Exeter from 1642 to 1646. He spent that time largely in exile from his see, which he perhaps never visited. He did find a position there for Seth Ward. He was both a Royalist in politics, and a Calvinist in religion, an unusual combination of the period. Brownrigg opposed Laudianism in Cambridge during the 1630s and at the Short Parliament Convocation of 1640. Nominated to the Westminster Assembly, he apparently took no part in it.

Life

He studied at Ipswich, and Pembroke Hall, Cambridge. He was awarded an M.A. in 1614 and a D.D. in 1626. He was Rector of St Margaret of Antioch, Barley, in Hertfordshire, in 1621.

He was Master of St Catharine's College, Cambridge, and Vice-Chancellor of the University of Cambridge, but in 1646 was ejected from both these positions, by the Parliamentary government. He was also deprived of his See by Parliament on 9 October 1646, as episcopacy was abolished for the duration of the Commonwealth and the Protectorate.

He took refuge with Thomas Rich, lord of the manor of Sonning.

Works

He continued to preach, for example at the Temple Church, and a collection of sermons of his was published posthumously.

Notes

External links
Bibliographic directory from Project Canterbury
Biography
Sermon from 1644

1592 births
1659 deaths
Bishops of Exeter
Westminster Divines
Masters of St Catharine's College, Cambridge
Alumni of Pembroke College, Cambridge
Vice-Chancellors of the University of Cambridge
17th-century Church of England bishops